Anamika Bhargava (born 13 April 1989) is an American former professional tennis player.

Bhargava has a career-high WTA doubles ranking of 283, reached on 24 June 2013. In her career, she won nine doubles titles on the ITF Women's Circuit.

Bhargava made her WTA Tour main-draw debut at the 2012 Texas Tennis Open, also in the doubles tournament.

ITF finals

Singles: 2 (2 runner-ups)

Doubles: 15 (9 titles, 6 runner-ups)

External links
 
 

1989 births
Living people
American female tennis players
American sportspeople of Indian descent
Indian-American tennis players
Tennis people from New York (state)
People from Collierville, Tennessee
Pepperdine Waves women's tennis players
21st-century American women